Upper Black Eddy, locally referred to as UBE, is a village located in northern Bucks County, Pennsylvania, United States.

Upper Black Eddy is officially part of Bridgeton Township, which also borders the adjacent borough of Milford, New Jersey via the Delaware River Joint Toll Bridge Commission's free Upper Black Eddy-Milford Bridge over the Delaware River.

History
Upper Black Eddy originates from the Black family, who operated a hotel at this point on the Delaware River and did share part of its unique name with the former village of (Lower Black Eddy) now known as Point Pleasant, Pennsylvania.

The village's growth in the early 19th century was due to the opening of the Pennsylvania Canal passing through the village as a result canal-related businesses sprang up quickly, including a shipyard, mule stables, general store and several hotels; the most notable was the Upper Black Eddy Inn.  This was later transformed into Chef Tell's Manor House, which closed in 2004 and was demolished in 2010.

The Upper Black Eddy portion of the Pennsylvania Canal was also known as "Candy Bend". Origins of that name are due to the canal boats throwing coal to the residents as they threw candy back to the boats. There is no conclusive evidence to validate this local lore.

Upper Black Eddy has two notable geographic features:

Ringing Rocks Park. This is a four-acre (16,000 m²) boulder field of weathered Diabase rocks, some of which "ring" much like a bell when struck with a hammer. This park also includes Buck County's highest waterfall situated on High Rocks Creek.

Nockamixon Cliffs. 400 foot shale cliffs overlooking the Delaware River is located within the Delaware Canal State Park.

Notable people
 Danny Federici, organ, glockenspiel, and accordion player for Bruce Springsteen's E Street Band
 Leslie Parrish, actress, The Manchurian Candidate and Li'l Abner
Bill White, former Major League Baseball player and executive who later became a New York Yankees sportscaster
 Wolfgang Zuckermann, musician

References

External links

Unincorporated communities in Bucks County, Pennsylvania
Unincorporated communities in Pennsylvania